Pia is a feminine given name. In Spanish, it is spelled Pía.

In politics
Pia Adelsteen (born 1963), Danish politician
Pia Beckmann (born 1963), German politician and entrepreneur
 Pia Cayetano (born 1966), Filipina lawyer and politician
 Pia Christmas-Møller (born 1961), Danish politician
 Pia Olsen Dyhr (born 1971), Danish politician, former Minister for Trade and Investment and Minister for Transport
 Pia Gjellerup (born 1959), Danish politician
 Pia Hallström (1961–2016), Swedish politician
 Pia Kauma (born 1966), Finnish politician
 Pia Kjærsgaard (born 1947), Danish politician
 Pia Locatelli (born 1949), Italian politician
 Pia Nilsson (politician) (born 1962), Swedish politician
 Pia Viitanen (born 1967), Finnish politician and former Minister of Culture and Housing

In arts and entertainment
 Pia Arke (1958-2007), Danish Greenlandic painter, photographer and writer
 Pia Bajpai (born 1991), Indian film actress
 Pia Clemente, American film producer, first Filipino-American nominated for an Academy Award
 Pia Degermark (born 1949), Swedish retired actress
 Pia Di Ciaula, Canadian film editor
 Pia Douwes (born 1964), Dutch musical theater actress
 Pia Fries (born 1955), Swiss painter
 Pia Getty (born 1966), American independent filmmaker
 Pia Giancaro (born 1950), Italian retired actress
 Pia Guanio (born 1974), Filipina actress and television presenter
 Pia Guerra, Canadian comic book artist
 Pia Johansson (born 1960), Swedish actress
 Pia Juul (born 1962), Danish poet and writer
 Pia Maiocco (born 1962), American former bass guitarist and backing vocalist for the all-female hard rock band Vixen
 Pia Mia (born 1996), American singer, songwriter and model
 Pia Miller (born 1983), Chilean-born Australian fashion model, actress and television presenter
 Pia Miranda (born 1973), Australian actress
 Pia Pera (1956-2016), Italian novelist, essayist and translator
 Pia Reyes (born 1964), Filipina-American Playboy Playmate of the Month, model and actress
 Pía Sebastiani (1925-2015), Argentine pianist and composer
 Pia Tafdrup (born 1952), Danish poet and author
 Pia Tassinari (1903-1995), Italian opera singer
 Pia Tikka (born 1961), Finnish film director and screenwriter
 Pia Tjelta (born 1977), Norwegian actress
 Pia Toscano (born 1988), American singer and American Idol contestant
 Pia Wurtzbach (born 1989), German-Filipina actress, TV host and model, Miss Universe 2015
 Pia Zadora (born 1953), American actress and singer

In sports
 Pia Fink (born 1995), German cross-country skier
 Pia Hansen (born 1965), Swedish sport shooter, 2000 Olympic champion
 Pia Lionetti (born 1987), Italian archer
 Pia Nielsen, Danish retired badminton player
 Pia Nilsson (golfer) (born 1954), Swedish golfer
 Pia Schmid, Swiss Paralympic sprinter
 Pia Skrzyszowska, Polish 100 m hurdler and relay runner
 Pia Sundhage (born 1960), Swedish retired footballer
 Pia Sundstedt (born 1975), Finnish road and mountain cyclist
 Pia Tajnikar (born 1985), Slovenian sprinter
 Pia Thomsen, Danish cricketer who was on the 1993 national team
 Pia Trulsen (born 1991), Norwegian curler
 Pia Vogel (born 1969), Swiss rower
 Pia Wunderlich (born 1975), German footballer
 Pia Zebadiah Bernadet (born 1989), Indonesian badminton player
 Pia Zinck (born 1971), Danish retired high jumper

In journalism
 Pia Arcangel (born 1978), Filipina newscaster and journalist
 Pia Conde (born 1970), Swedish journalist and television presenter
 Pia Dijkstra (born 1954) Dutch former television newscaster who later became an elected politician
 Pia Hontiveros (born 1967), Filipina broadcast journalist
 Pia Lindström (born 1938), Swedish television anchor, daughter of Ingrid Bergman

Other
 Pia Cramling (born 1963), Swedish chess Grandmaster
 Pia Haraldsen (born 1981), Norwegian television personality
 Pia Nalli (1886-1964), Italian mathematician
 Pia de Solenni, 20th-21st century Catholic theologian
 Pia Waugh (born 1979), Australian free software adv

References

External links
 Behind The Name- Pia
 White Pages - Pia

Feminine given names